Christine Lake may refer to:

Christine Lake (Minnesota), a lake in Cook County
Christine Lake (New Hampshire), a lake in Coos County